Manikkawatha is a 2021 Sri Lankan drama serial broadcast on Independent Television Network. The series is directed by Sudath Rohana. It is the live action adaptation of critic's acclaimed novel by Mahinda Prasad Masimbula with the same name. It is produced by Fahim Maujud and music direction is by Navaratne Gamage. The serial stars Jagath Chamila in lead role along with Uma Aseni, Volga Kalpani, Sarath Kothalawala, W. Jayasiri and Priyankara Rathnayake make supportive roles.

Plot
The show is revolves around five main characters: "Ketihami", "Pichchi", "Gunadari", "Tilakaratne" and "Senehalatha" who live in the Ratnapura area, Sabaragamuwa Province. Ketihami is an ideal villager who lives a meager life in harmony with nature. "Pichchi" is the ideal village woman, who is the wife of Ketihami. Pichchihami who was raped by a man in the palace before entangled with Ketihami. Their first born: Gunadari, is a genuine character who faces life with great courage even as a disabled woman. She loves her father dearly. She lost her eyesight when she was a child due to a leopard bite. When she becomes a teenager, she starts to plow the fields at night. The story flows through their lives to battle with changes occur in the country.

Cast and characters
 Jagath Chamila as Ketihami
 Uma Aseni as Pichchi 
 Volga Kalpani as Gunadari 
 Sarath Kothalawala as Hathirihan Rala
 W. Jayasiri as Anthraekuruppu Garlis Arachchi
 Priyankara Rathnayake as Kirendera, Pichchi's father
 Palitha Silva
 Niroshan Wijesinghe as Rathu Nilame 
 Mayura Perera as Konduruhami
 Udayanthi Kulatunga as Royna
 Sanath Wimalasiri as Kalawaney Punchi Bandara
 G. R. Perera as Kottimbulawala Silwatha
 Prageeth Rathnayake as Manansingho, Konduruhami's elder son
 Madhushan Hathlahawatte
 Thilakshani Rathnayake
 Aruni Mendis
 Janak Premalal
 Nayana Hettiarachchi as Salindu, Pichchi's mother
 Samantha Kumara Gamage
 Saman Ekanayake as Abaddha, the jaggery maker
 Roshan Pilapitiya
 Mahesh Uyanwatta
 Chathuranga Dassanayake
 Pavithra Wickramasinghe as Sochchuhami, Hathirihan Rala's wife
 Dayasiri Hettiarachchi as Village salesman at Galahitiya junction
 Udeni Chandrasiri
 Anura Bandara Rajaguru
 Richard Abeywardena
 Ruwan Wickramasinghe
 Samadara Ariyawansa
 Rukman Tillakaratne
 S. I. Samarakkody

Child cast
 Pahandi Nethara as little Gunadari
 Nesta Maneth as little Manansingho
 Savindi Nirmani
 Sanyumi Nimnadi

Production
The writer of the book as well as the teledrama script is Mahinda Prasad Masimbula. He took three years to complete the book, from 2013 to 2016. Later, the book was nominated for the 2016 Swarna Pusthaka Awards as well.

The teledrama marked the comeback of award-winning director Sudath Rohana to direction after eight years. According to the director, the book reveals the great analysis of the socio-economic, political, and cultural changes that took place over a period of one hundred years from 1880 to 1980 in Sri Lanka. To obtain cinematic appearance, the screenplay was revised twelve times. While reading the book, award-winning actor Jagath Chamila came to Rohana's mind for the role of "Keti Hami". Then he selected Volga Kalpani for the blind female role, "Gunadari". Many such characters were selected while reading the book. Even when writing the script, actors were chosen for certain characters, where most of them have worked with Rohana before.

The shooting of the series was set against the backdrop of the scenic beauty of the Balangoda area. The premiere of the teledrama was held on 9 December 2021 at "Ape Gama" premises in Battaramulla. Thusitha Anuradha contributed the camera where as Jagath Weeratunga is the editor and Praveen Jayaratne with color combination. Saman Lenin, Nilakshi Halapitiya, Sunil Edirisinghe and Abhisheka Wimalaweera made singing where  the lyrics composed by Dr. Rathna Sri Wijesinghe and the music of Navaratne Gamage.

Release
The teledrama telecasts on Independent Television Network on every weekend from 19 December 2021 at 8.30 pm. According to director, the series will be available in YouTube with English subtitles as well as with Japanese and Chinese languages. It can also be heard on weekends from 9.30 to 10.00pm from Lakhanda Radio.

References 

Sri Lankan television shows
2021 Sri Lankan television series debuts
Sri Lankan television series